Peter Nicholas Price (born 19 February 1942) is a British politician who served as a Member of the European Parliament (MEP) from 1979–1994.

He was educated at RGS Worcester, Aberdare Boys' Grammar School, the University of Southampton and at King's College London. He served as Conservative MEP for Lancashire West from 1979–1984, and as Conservative MEP for London South East from 1984–1994. He made headlines in 1997 when he became one of the first politicians to change parties from the Conservatives to the Liberal Democrats. He continues to work with both the Liberal Democrat party in Wales and with the European Strategy Council in London. Price trained as a solicitor in London which is still his main profession. From 2002-4 he served on the Richard Commission which proposed increased powers for the National Assembly for Wales, and he has served on various bodies associated with the Assembly. As of 2015 he is a member of the Board of the Wales Audit Office.

References

1942 births
Living people
People educated at the Royal Grammar School Worcester
Alumni of the University of Southampton
Alumni of King's College London
Conservative Party (UK) MEPs
People from Newport, Shropshire
MEPs for England 1979–1984
MEPs for England 1984–1989
MEPs for England 1989–1994
Liberal Democrats (UK) politicians